Dunbar railway station serves the town of Dunbar in East Lothian, Scotland. It is located on the East Coast Main Line and is a two platform station.

History

The station, which was first opened by the North British Railway in June 1846, used to have two platforms and an overall roof. The northbound platform loop line was taken out of use and lifted in the early 1970s, whilst the platform itself and the station roof were both removed during the modernisation and electrification by British Rail of the northern end of the East Coast Main Line in 1987–88.

For approximately five months in 1979, this was the terminal station for a shuttle service to Edinburgh Waverley. The shuttle service was provided after the East Coast Main Line was blocked due to the collapse of Penmanshiel Tunnel. Buses linked Dunbar with Berwick-upon-Tweed, from where rail services to London King's Cross resumed.

Platform Layout 
The main platform (One) is located on a loop adjacent to the main through lines. The second platform is on the main northbound line which has had trains stopping there since 15 December 2019.

Prior to December 2019, the line on which the main platform is located was bi-directional (meaning that trains travelling to/from London or Edinburgh Waverley had to take it in turns to use the station if they were scheduled to stop there). Preliminary work into a new second platform began in October 2015. In December 2018, Network Rail announced (via press release) that Amco had been appointed the contractors for the construction of the second platform, which would start in Summer 2019 and was intended to have the works completed by early 2020. Construction of the new platform necessitated a new footbridge with lifts, and improvements to the station carpark were carried out as part of the project. The bridge was completed ahead of schedule and the new platform opened in December 2019. Final fitting work and completion of the carpark continued, however it was delayed due to the coronavirus pandemic.

With all Northbound services now using the second platform and no longer using the main platform loop (with the exception of all terminating Scotrail Services from Edinburgh), this now leaves Syston station in Leicester as the only rare example of a single platformed main line railway station used on a major route.

Accidents and incidents
On 3 January 1898, an express passenger train collided with a freight train that was being shunted. One person was killed and 21 were injured.

Facilities
The station is fully staffed, with the ticket office open throughout the week (Monday - Friday 05:55 - 21:30, Saturday 06:25 - 20:40 and Sunday 11:15 - 21:30).  Self-service ticket machines are also provided for use outside these times and for collecting pre-paid tickets. There are toilets, a payphone and vending machines on the concourse.  Train running information is provided by manual announcements, digital CIS displays, a customer help point and timetable posters.  Level access is available from the entrance and concourse to the platform.

There are two platforms. The station entrance is to the east, adjacent to the southbound platform. The northbound platform, reinstated in 2019, is accessible via a footbridge with lifts.

Services
The station is served by ScotRail, CrossCountry, London North Eastern Railway and TransPennine Express. It was managed by the InterCity East Coast franchise holder until June 2015 when responsibility was transferred from Virgin Trains East Coast to Abellio ScotRail.

The daytime service at Dunbar is as follows:

ScotRail
ScotRail run a service to/from Edinburgh Waverley every 2 hours which starts and terminates here which call at Musselburgh and Edinburgh Waverley. These services do not operate on Sundays.

LNER
LNER provide a limited service at Dunbar. This is as follows:

On Monday to Thursdays, there are 4 trains per day south; 3 of these go to London Kings Cross, while 1 operates to Leeds. On Fridays there is an extra late night service which terminates at Newcastle. On Saturdays, there are 2 trains per day to London Kings Cross, 1 to Doncaster and 1 to Newcastle. On Sundays, there are 2 trains per day to London Kings Cross, 1 to Doncaster and 1 to Newcastle. There are also 7 trains per day north to Edinburgh, 7 days a week.

TransPennine Express
TransPennine Express provide the following service, There are 5 southbound trains per day to Newcastle plus an extra 2 trains which terminate at Berwick. Northbound, there are 4 trains per day to Edinburgh, of which 2 trains from Newcastle and Berwick do not stop here

CrossCountry
CrossCountry provide a 2 hourly service to Edinburgh and Plymouth with some extended services to Glasgow, Aberdeen and Penzance.

References

Bibliography 

 
 
 
 Scotrail timetables: Glasgow - Edinburgh - North Berwick & Dunbar

External links
Video footage of Dunbar railway station

Railway stations in East Lothian
Former North British Railway stations
Railway stations in Great Britain opened in 1846
Railway stations served by ScotRail
Railway stations served by CrossCountry
Railway stations served by London North Eastern Railway
Railway stations served by TransPennine Express
1846 establishments in Scotland
Listed railway stations in Scotland
Category B listed buildings in East Lothian
Dunbar